Bentley Township is a civil township of Gladwin County in the U.S. state of Michigan.  As of the 2010 census, the township population was 844.

Communities
The Rhodes 48652 ZIP Code serves the majority of the township. The community was settled by Rhodes, an early postmaster and businessman in the local lumber industry, who gave the community his last name.
It was formed around a lumber mill in 1891. For a time, it was an incorporated village but was disincorporated in 1920.

Geography

Demographics
As of the census of 2000, there were 859 people, 327 households, and 255 families residing in the township.  The population density was 24.1 per square mile (9.3/km2). There were 361 housing units at an average density of 10.1 per square mile (3.9/km2).  The racial makeup of the township was 98.14% White, 0.47% Native American, 0.12% Pacific Islander, and 1.28% from two or more races. Hispanic or Latino of any race were 0.70% of the population.

There were 327 households, out of which 31.8% had children under the age of 18 living with them, 64.8% were married couples living together, 8.6% had a female householder with no husband present, and 22.0% were non-families. 18.0% of all households were made up of individuals, and 7.6% had someone living alone who was 65 years of age or older.  The average household size was 2.60 and the average family size was 2.91.

In the township the population was spread out, with 24.7% under the age of 18, 7.3% from 18 to 24, 30.5% from 25 to 44, 22.5% from 45 to 64, and 15.0% who were 65 years of age or older.  The median age was 37 years. For every 100 females, there were 97.5 males.  For every 100 females age 18 and over, there were 97.9 males.

The median income for a household in the township was $37,125, and the median income for a family was $40,179. Males had a median income of $35,972 versus $23,750 for females. The per capita income for the township was $15,074.  About 13.0% of families and 16.1% of the population were below the poverty line, including 22.1% of those under age 18 and 8.6% of those age 65 or over.

Images

References

Townships in Gladwin County, Michigan
Townships in Michigan
Populated places established in 1948
1948 establishments in Michigan